Man Who Wanted to Kill Himself is a 1942 Spanish comedy film directed by Rafael Gil and starring Antonio Casal and Rosita Yarza. It is based on a short story by Wenceslao Fernández Flórez. It was remade in 1970 by the same director.

Premise
Federico Solá (Antonio Casal) is a 30 years old provincial architect who, in the same day, loses his job, his girlfriend, his located room and decides to commit suicide.

Cast
 Antonio Casal ...  Federico Solá
 Rosita Yarza ...  Irene Argüelles
Manuel Arbó	 ... 	Sr. Argüelles
Xan das Bolas	... 	Huésped
José Prada	... 	Presidente círculo
Camino Garrigó	... 	Patrona
Irene Mas	... 	Juanita
Alejandro Nolla	... 	Fabricante
José Acuaviva	... 	Periodista
Alberto López	... 	Jorge
Ángel Alcaraz	... 	Bragao
Ramón Giner	... 	Catador (as Ramón J. Giner)
Pedro Mascaró	... 	Dueño del bar
Jesús Castro Blanco	... 	Tendero (as Castro-Blanco)
José Palomerá	... 	Portero fábrica

External links
 

1942 films
1942 comedy films
Cifesa films
Spanish comedy films
1940s Spanish-language films
Spanish black-and-white films
Spain in fiction
Films directed by Rafael Gil
1940s Spanish films